Raymond Bernard Wolf (July 15, 1904 – October 6, 1979), nicknamed "Bear" Wolf, was an American football and baseball player and coach. Wolf was a native of Illinois and an alumnus of Texas Christian University (TCU), where he played college football and college baseball. He played professional baseball for two seasons, and appeared in one Major League Baseball game for the Cincinnati Reds in 1927. Wolf served as the head football coach at the University of North Carolina (1936–1941), the University of Florida (1946–1949) and Tulane University (1952–1953). He was also the head baseball coach at his alma mater, TCU, from 1935 to 1936 and the athletic director at Florida from 1946 to 1949.

Early years
Wolf was born in Chicago, in 1904. He attended Texas Christian University (TCU) in Fort Worth, Texas, where he played tackle for the Texas Christian Horned Frogs football team from 1924 to 1926. He played professional baseball for the Cincinnati Reds organization for a single season in 1927, but returned to TCU to graduate in 1928. Thereafter, Wolf got his start in coaching, working with the TCU linemen from 1929 to 1935.

Coaching career
From 1936 to 1941, Wolf was employed by the University of North Carolina in Chapel Hill, North Carolina to coach the North Carolina Tar Heels football team, and compiled a 38–17–3 record in six seasons. The university board of trustees renewed his contract at an increased salary in 1941 for an additional five years, but his service in the navy prevented him from coaching during World War II.

Wolf became an officer in the U.S. Navy Reserve in 1942 during World War II. After initial training, he worked as a football coach at two of the service's naval aviation training stations, including the Navy's Pre-Flight School in Athens, Georgia and Flight Preparatory School in Austin, Texas. He led the 1942 Georgia Pre-Flight Skycrackers football team to a 7–1–1 record, including victories over Penn, Auburn, and Alabama. He was eventually promoted to lieutenant commander, and after the war ended in September 1945, the Navy released Wolf to inactive duty.

In 1946, Wolf was hired by the University of Florida in Gainesville, Florida to be the new head football coach of the Florida Gators football team, replacing coach Tom Lieb. Wolf coached the Gators for four seasons from 1946 to 1949 and posted a 13–24–2 record, but his Southeastern Conference (SEC) record was 2–17–2. The Florida Board of Control balked at renewing his contract when his initial three-year term expired after the 1948 season, but offered him a two-year contract extension in the aftermath of widespread public demonstrations of support by the football team and the Florida student body. Wolf was fired after the 1949 season, but nevertheless managed to leave Florida on a high note when his 1949 Gators upset the rival Georgia Bulldogs 28–7 for the first and only time during his tenure. In retrospect, Wolf's loyal Gators football players ironically dubbed his tenure as the "Golden Era," and many of his returning players formed the nucleus of Bob Woodruff's improving Gators football teams of the early 1950s.

In 1950, Wolf was hired by head coach Henry Frnka of Tulane University in New Orleans, Louisiana, to be a senior assistant coach for the Tulane Green Wave football team. When Frnka unexpectedly resigned in March 1952, Wolf became the head coach and led the Green Wave during the 1952 and 1953 seasons, finishing with a 6–13–1 overall record and 3–12 in the SEC.

Later years
After retiring from coaching after the 1953 season, Wolf became an administrative officer at TCU, his alma mater. He was honored as a member of the TCU Lettermen's Association Hall of Fame. Wolf died of cancer in Fort Worth, Texas in 1979.

Head coaching record

Football

References

Bibliography
  2012 Florida Football Media Guide, University Athletic Association, Gainesville, Florida (2012).
Carlson, Norm, University of Florida Football Vault: The History of the Florida Gators, Whitman Publishing, LLC, Atlanta, Georgia (2007).  .
Golenbock, Peter, Go Gators!  An Oral History of Florida's Pursuit of Gridiron Glory, Legends Publishing, LLC, St. Petersburg, Florida (2002).  .
Hairston, Jack, Tales from the Gator Swamp: A Collection of the Greatest Gator Stories Ever Told, Sports Publishing, LLC, Champaign, Illinois (2002).  .
McCarthy, Kevin M.,  Fightin' Gators: A History of University of Florida Football, Arcadia Publishing, Mount Pleasant, South Carolina (2000).  .
McEwen, Tom, The Gators: A Story of Florida Football, The Strode Publishers, Huntsville, Alabama (1974).  .
Nash, Noel, ed., The Gainesville Sun Presents The Greatest Moments in Florida Gators Football, Sports Publishing, Inc., Champaign, Illinois (1998).  .
Proctor, Samuel, & Wright Langley, Gator History: A Pictorial History of the University of Florida, South Star Publishing Company, Gainesville, Florida (1986).  .

External links

 

1904 births
1979 deaths
Cincinnati Reds players
Columbus Senators players
Florida Gators athletic directors
Florida Gators football coaches
Georgia Pre-Flight Skycrackers football coaches
Major League Baseball first basemen
North Carolina Tar Heels football coaches
TCU Horned Frogs athletic directors
TCU Horned Frogs baseball players
TCU Horned Frogs baseball coaches
TCU Horned Frogs football players
TCU Horned Frogs football coaches
Tulane Green Wave football coaches
United States Navy officers
Baseball players from Chicago
Players of American football from Chicago
United States Navy reservists
United States Navy personnel of World War II
Deaths from cancer in Texas
Military personnel from Illinois